Abel-Dominique Boyé (6 May 1864 – 1934) was a French painter. He was born in Marmande, France. He studied under Jean-Joseph Benjamin-Constant. In 1930, Boyé was awarded the Légion d'Honneur.

References

People from Marmande
1864 births
1934 deaths
19th-century French painters
French male painters
20th-century French painters
20th-century French male artists
Chevaliers of the Légion d'honneur
19th-century French male artists